Jamie Hill (born 14 June 1999) is a Welsh rugby union player, currently playing for Pro14 and side Cardiff Rugby. His preferred position is scrum-half.

Cardiff Rugby
Initially signing for the Cardiff academy squad. He made his Cardiff debut in Round 3 of the 2020–21 Pro14 against Munster. He is now a member of the Cardiff senior squad.

References

External links
itsrugby.co.uk Profile

1999 births
Living people
Welsh rugby union players
Cardiff Rugby players
Rugby union scrum-halves
Rugby union players from Pontypridd